Honigman is an Israeli fashion company specializing in ladies fashion clothing.  For children, a separate store Honigman Kids exits alongside their sub-brand Virus, sold inside the Honigman Kids stores.  Honigman is also the parent company to the teen fashion clothing brand, TNT.

Established in 1947, Honigman is one of Israel's largest clothing companies with its three brands, Honigman, Honigman Kids, and TNT, being sold in 150 stores across the country.

Models 
Sendi Bar
George Barnett
Jesus Luz
Melanie Peres
Shiraz Tal
Ayelet Zurer

See also
Israeli fashion

References

External links
 Honigman  
 Honigman Kids 

Clothing brands
Clothing retailers of Israel
Clothing companies of Israel
Clothing companies established in 1947
Companies based in Tel Aviv
Israeli brands
1947 establishments in Mandatory Palestine